State Road 457 (NM 457) is a  state highway in the US state of New Mexico. NM 457's southern terminus is at U.S. Route 82 (US 82) west of Lovington, and the northern terminus is at US 380 west-northwest of Tatum.

Major intersections

See also

References

457
Transportation in Lea County, New Mexico